Tamás Bujkó (2 December 1962 – 21 March 2008) was a Hungarian judo competitor who competed at World Championship and Olympic levels.

Career
Bujkó competed at the 1983 World Judo Championships (where he won a silver medal), the 1985 World Judo Championships (where he won a bronze medal), and the 1987 World Judo Championships (where he also won a bronze medal). He also competed at the 1988 Summer Olympics, where he came in fifth place.

Death
Bujkó was murdered in London on 21 March 2008; his murderer Ference Ifi was sentenced to life in prison.

References

1959 births
2008 deaths
Hungarian male judoka
Olympic judoka of Hungary
Judoka at the 1988 Summer Olympics
Hungarian murder victims
Male murder victims
People murdered in London
Goodwill Games medalists in judo
Competitors at the 1986 Goodwill Games